Democracy for the Arab World Now (DAWN) is an American non-profit organization founded in September 2020 that advocates for democracy and human rights in the Middle East.

Director Sarah Leah Whitson said it was established based on the "belief that only democracy and freedom will bring lasting peace and security to the Middle East and North Africa."

Whitson said DAWN would be funded by private individuals and foundations and eschew any government financial assistance – in part, precisely because one aspect of its mission is "to hold Western states accountable" for enabling abuses by authoritarian governments.

References

Organizations established in 2020
Human rights organizations based in the United States